Kabaneri of the Iron Fortress was directed by Tetsurō Araki and written by Ichirō Ōkouchi, with music by Hiroyuki Sawano and original character designs by Haruhiko Mikimoto. The series was broadcast on Fuji TV's Noitamina block from April 8 to June 30, 2016, with a total of 12 episodes. A prologue for the anime premiered for a week in theaters across Japan starting March 18, 2016. Amazon streamed the series on their Amazon Prime Instant Video service. Two compilation films premiered in Japanese theaters on December 31, 2016, and January 7, 2017. Crunchyroll and Funimation co-released the anime on Blu-ray and DVD in the United States; Crunchyroll also acquired the merchandise rights.

An anime theatrical film that is set six months after the anime series, titled , premiered on May 10, 2019. A Netflix version was released as a three part series in 2019.

Episode list

Films

Notes

References

Kabaneri of the Iron Fortress